Chu Liuxiang is the fictional protagonist of the wuxia novel series Chu Liuxiang Series by Taiwanese writer Gu Long. His given name "Liuxiang" literally means "lingering fragrance". Nicknamed "Daoshuai" ("Bandit Chief") or "Xiangshuai" ("Chief Xiang"), he steals from the rich to help the poor and upholds justice in the jianghu (martial artists' community). He has been portrayed in numerous films and television series adapted from the novel series by notable actors such as Ti Lung, Adam Cheng, Michael Miu, Richie Ren, Ken Chu and Ken Chang.

Character description 
Chu Liuxiang is a martial arts expert whose prowess in qinggong is one of the best – if not the best – in the jianghu (martial artists' community). He wields a metal hand fan as his weapon and uses it only for self-defence. Despite his superb combat skills and impressive qinggong, one of his definitive traits is that he has never killed anyone in his whole life. Usually, he relies on his wit, experience and calm to solve mysteries and overcome enemies who are far more powerful than him. The identity of his martial arts master is unknown, and even the well-informed Shuimu Yinji could only deduce that he is an apprentice of Ye Di, a character from Daqi Yingxiong Zhuan, another of Gu Long's novels.

Although his age is not mentioned in any of the novels, Chu Liuxiang is probably around 30 years old when the events of the novels take place. In Bianfu Chuanqi, his childhood friend, Hu Tiehua, is 33 years old. Chu Liuxiang is presumably around the same age as Hu Tiehua since they grew up together.

Chu Liuxiang lives on a houseboat, called "Xiang's Pavilion", with three young beauties. They are the closest people to him apart from his best friends, Hu Tiehua and Ji Bingyan. They come from pitiful backgrounds and have been following Chu Liuxiang on his adventures since they were 11 or 12. The first, Su Rongrong, is kind and understanding and specialises in the art of disguise. The second, Li Hongxiu, is very clear and alert and has a good memory. The third one, Song Tian'er, is a good cook and is the most mischievous and adorable of the three. Chu Liuxiang also meets several other beautiful maidens on his adventures, such as Heizhenzhu, Shi Xiuyun, Hua Zhenzhen, Dong Sanniang and Xinyue. He eventually marries Zhang Jiejie, whom he meets in Taohua Chuanqi.

A legendary and highly reputable figure in the jianghu, Chu Liuxiang has a wide network of friends, acquaintances and contacts. They include: Hu Tiehua, his childhood friend who has a penchant for alcoholic drinks; Ji Bingyan, who appears cold and indifferent but is actually very warm-hearted; Wuhua, a Buddhist monk who later turns out to be a villain; Zhongyuan Yidianhong, a powerful swordsman and contract killer; Zuo Qinghou, the hospitable master of Cup-Throwing Manor; "Swift Net" Zhang San, a marine expert and excellent chef of grilled fish.

Novels

Chu Liuxiang Chuanqi 

The three novels, Xuehai Piaoxiang, Da Shamo and Huameiniao, form a story arc and are collectively known as Chu Liuxiang Chuanqi.

Xuehai Piaoxiang
Chu Liuxiang steals a rare flower from the imperial capital and brings it back to his boathouse. His curiosity piqued after seeing the corpses of several top martial artists drifting towards him, he decides to investigate their deaths. In the meantime, the Heaven's One Holy Water, a deadly potion from the Holy Water Palace, an all-female martial arts school, is stolen. Chu Liuxiang immediately becomes the suspect because, given his prowess in qinggong and martial arts, he is the probably the only person capable of stealing something from the Holy Water Palace and getting away undetected. Faced with seemingly insurmountable odds and a pressing deadline, Chu Liuxiang manages to solve the mysteries and clear his name. His friend, Wuhua, turns out to be the mastermind behind everything. Chu Liuxiang confronts Wuhua and defeats him in a fight, after which Wuhua commits suicide by consuming poison.

Da Shamo
Chu Liuxiang returns to his boathouse and discovers that Su Rongrong, Li Hongxiu and Song Tian'er have gone missing. The three maidens are among his closest companions, and he knows that they will not leave without notifying him. He travels a long journey in search of them and reaches the desert, where he meets his friends, Hu Tiehua and Ji Bingyan. Through a series of adventures and strange encounters, Chu Liuxiang learns that a mysterious villainess, Shiguanyin, is the mastermind behind a sinister plot. One of her accomplices is Wuhua, who has actually survived after attempting suicide. Chu Liuxiang foils Shiguanyin's plot, defeats her in combat, and she commits suicide. Even after everything is over, Chu Liuxiang has not found the three missing girls yet.

Huameiniao
Chu Liuxiang has a series of encounters with Li Yuhan and his wife, Liu Wumei, a former apprentice of Shiguanyin. He also gets into conflict with Shuimu Yinji, the mistress of the Holy Water Palace, and engages her in a dramatic one-on-one fight that shocks the entire jianghu. He eventually emerges victorious, exposes an evil scheme by Li Yuhan and Liu Wumei, and rescues the three missing maidens.

Chu Liuxiang Xinzhuan 

The five novels, Bianfu Chuanqi, Guilian Xiaqing, Taohua Chuanqi, Xinyue Chuanqi and Wuye Landau, are collectively known as Chu Liuxiang Xinzhuan.

Bianfu Chuanqi
There is a strange island called Bat Island, which is rumoured to contain numerous treasures and luxuries. The island is actually a secret trading post for black market items in the jianghu, such as exclusive martial arts manuals. From time to time, the island's master, nicknamed "Bat Gongzi", will send exclusive invitations to selected guests to visit and trade on the island. Trade deals are done inside a dark cave to maintain secrecy.

Through a series of serendipitous events, Chu Liuxiang and his friends Hu Tiehua and Zhang San make their way to Bat Island with other companions. Along the way, some of their companions are mysteriously murdered. Chu Liuxiang also encounters Yuan Suiyun, a blind but powerful martial artist from a reputable family. Eventually, on the island, they uncover a sinister plot by "Bat Gongzi", who turns out to be actually Yuan Suiyun. At the critical moment, Jin Lingzhi, Yuan Suiyun's girlfriend who has secretly fallen in love with Hu Tiehua, saves everyone by setting up a plan to stop Yuan Suiyun.

Guilian Xiaqing; alternatively known as Guilian Chuanqi and Jieshi Huanhun
Zuo Qinghou is a famous martial artist in the Jiangnan region and the master of Cup-Throwing Manor. His beloved daughter, Zuo Mingzhu, dies after contracting a strange disease. In the meantime, another young maiden, Shi Yin, also dies from illness. At the moment of Shi Yin's death, Zuo Mingzhu suddenly returns to life and claims she is Shi Yin. It seems as if Shi Yin's spirit has possessed Zuo Mingzhu's body. Zuo Qinghou gets his close friend, Chu Liuxiang, to help him resolve the bizarre case.

Through his calm and wit, Chu Liuxiang gradually unravels the mystery and learns that it is tied to two pairs of star-crossed lovers. On one hand, Zuo Mingzhu is in love with Xue Bin, but they can never be together because the Zuo and Xue families have a long history of bad blood. On the other hand, Shi Yin is in love with Ye Shenglan but her parents have arranged for her to marry Xue Bin. Thus, both sides came up with an elaborate plan to trick their parents: Shi Yin fakes her death so that she can elope with Ye Shenglan; Zuo Mingzhu pretends to be possessed by Shi Yin's spirit so that she can marry Xue Bin. After uncovering the truth, Chu Liuxiang helps the two pairs of lovers get together and gives them his blessings.

Taohua Chuanqi
In the jianghu, there is a mysterious clan of unknown origin who practise a strange religion. In every generation, a girl will be chosen from within the clan to serve as their Sacred Maiden, who must then take a vow of celibacy. The mother of the girl who has been selected to be the Sacred Maiden does not want her daughter to spend the rest of her life in solitude. She notices Chu Liuxiang and thinks he might be an ideal spouse for her daughter, so she sets up an elaborate plan to lure him into taking a series of challenges to assess his suitability. The story ends with a cliffhanger that resembles the famous paradox in the English short story The Lady, or the Tiger?.

Xinyue Chuanqi
The people living in the coastal areas are under constant threat from raids by pirates. The government enlists the help of a martial arts school, Jade Sword Manor, to deal with the pirates. The elimination of the pirates, however, pave the way for the rise of a formidable pirate king, Shi Tianwang, who becomes the new threat on the seas and in the jianghu. He is not only powerful in martial arts, but also extremely elusive and unpredictable. For example, he has six decoys to help him mask his true identity.

"Mister Du", the mysterious female leader of Jade Sword Manor, comes up with a plan to eliminate Shi Tianwang. She asks the government to bestow the title of a princess on her daughter, Xinyue ("New Moon"), and pretends to offer her daughter's hand-in-marriage to the pirate king to appease him. Xinyue, now known as "Princess Jade Sword", will then find an opportunity to assassinate him.

By chance, Chu Liuxiang meets Xinyue's father, Jiao Lin, who seeks his help in finding his long-lost daughter. However, things become complicated when he learns that "Mister Du" has recruited his best friend, Hu Tiehua, to help her escort Xinyue safely to the pirate king. As news of the planned marriage spread like wildfire throughout the jianghu, more parties get involved. Chu Liuxiang encounters Ishida Hitoshihiko-Saemon, a Japanese ninja master seeking vengeance on Shi Tianwang for stealing his concubine, Baoji. At the same time, Baoji, fearing that she will fall out of Shi Tianwang's favour after he marries Xinyue, has sent her assassins to kill Xinyue.

Although Chu Liuxiang starts a romance with Xinyue, who also pledges her love to him, she eventually marries Shi Tianwang. On their wedding night, she successfully distinguishes the real Shi Tianwang from his six decoys and assassinates him, thus completing her mission and restoring peace to the jianghu.

Wuye Lanhua
There are rumours in the jianghu that Chu Liuxiang is dead. A mysterious "Mister Orchid" believes Chu Liuxiang is still alive so he/she sets up an elaborate plot to lure him out of hiding.

Adaptations

Films

Television

Video games 
 Master Chu and the Drunkard Hu
 Chu Liuxiang Xinzhuan is a RPG released in 2001 by Taiwan's UserJoy Technology. The game's story line is based on four novels in the series: Guilian Xiaqing, Taohua Chuanqi, Xinyue Chuanqi and Wuye Lanhua.

References 

Gu Long characters
Chu Liuxiang (novel series)